Alphonse Parfondry (born 1896) was a cyclist from Belgium. He won the silver medal in the Team Road race in the 1924 Summer Olympics in Paris.

References

External links
 
 

Belgian male cyclists
1896 births
Year of death missing
Cyclists at the 1924 Summer Olympics
Olympic cyclists of Belgium
Olympic silver medalists for Belgium
Olympic medalists in cycling
Place of birth missing
Medalists at the 1924 Summer Olympics